Research into the predominant human Y-DNA haplogroups of Central Asia and North Asia, broken down according to both individual publications and ethnolinguistic groups, are summarized in the table below.

The first two columns of the table list ethnicity and linguistic affiliations, the third column cites the total sample size in each study, and the adjoining columns give the percentage of each haplogroup or subclade found sample in a particular sample.

List

See also
Y-DNA haplogroups in Kazakh tribes
Demography of Central Asia
Indigenous peoples of Siberia
Y-DNA haplogroups by population
Y-DNA haplogroups in populations of the Caucasus
Y-DNA haplogroups in populations of South Asia
Y-DNA haplogroups in populations of East and Southeast Asia
Y-DNA haplogroups in populations of the Near East
Y-DNA haplogroups in populations of North Africa
Y-DNA haplogroups in populations of Europe
Y-DNA haplogroups in populations of Oceania
Y-DNA haplogroups in populations of Sub-Saharan Africa
Y-DNA haplogroups in indigenous peoples of the Americas

References

External links
Y-DNA Ethnographic and Genographic Atlas and Open-Source Data Compilation

Asia Central And North